The Stowe Tunnel is a road tunnel in Stowe Township.

External links
 Stowe Tunnel at Bridgehunter.com

References

Road tunnels in Pennsylvania
1909 establishments in Pennsylvania
Tunnels in Allegheny County, Pennsylvania